Aminopeptidases are enzymes that catalyze the cleavage of amino acids from the amino terminus (N-terminus) of proteins or peptides (exopeptidases). They are widely distributed throughout the animal and plant kingdoms and are found in many subcellular organelles, in cytosol, and as membrane components. Aminopeptidases are used in essential cellular functions. Many, but not all, of these peptidases are zinc metalloenzymes.

Some aminopeptidases are monomeric, and others are assemblies of relatively high mass (50 kDa) subunits. cDNA sequences are available for several aminopeptidases and a crystal structure of the open state of human endoplasmic reticulum Aminopeptidase 1 ERAP1 is presented here. Amino acid sequences determined directly or deduced from cDNAs indicate some amino acid sequence homologies in organisms as diverse as Escherichia coli and mammals, particularly in catalytically important residues or in residues involved in metal ion binding.

One important aminopeptidase is a zinc-dependent enzyme produced and secreted by glands of the small intestine. It helps the enzymatic digestion of proteins. Additional digestive enzymes produced by these glands include dipeptidases, maltase, sucrase, lactase, and enterokinase.

See also 
 Alanine aminopeptidase
 Carboxypeptidase

References

External links 
 

Zinc proteins
EC 3.4